The 2016–17 LEN Champions League was the 54th edition of LEN's premier competition for men's water polo clubs. It ran from 30 September 2016 to 27 May 2017.

Team allocation

8 teams are directly qualified for the preliminary round.

Round and draw dates
The schedule of the competition is as follows.

Qualifying rounds

Qualification I
Fifteen teams take part in the Qualification round I. They were drawn into three groups of four teams and one group of three teams, whose played on 30 September−2 October 2016. Top 2 teams of each group advance to qualification round II.

Group A
Tournament was played in Oradea, Romania.

Group B
Tournament was played in Budapest, Hungary.

Group C
Tournament was played in Porto, Portugal.

Group D
Tournament was played in Valletta, Malta.

Qualification II
Sixteen teams take part in the Qualification round II. Eight teams from first round and eight teams with wild cards. They were drawn into four groups of four teams, whose played on 14−16 October 2016. Top 2 teams of each group advance to qualification round III.

Group E
Tournament was played in Eger, Hungary.

Group F
Tournament was played in Brescia, Italy.

Group G
Tournament was played in Herceg Novi, Montenegro.

Group H
Tournament was played in Rijeka, Croatia.

Qualification III

Eight teams take part in the Qualification round III. These teams played against each other over two legs on a home-and-away basis. The mechanism of the draws for each round was as follow:
In the draw for the Qualification round III, the four group winners were seeded, and the four group runners-up were unseeded. The seeded teams were drawn against the unseeded teams. Teams from the same group could not be drawn against each other.

1st leg: 26 October 2016
2nd leg: 9 November 2016

|}

Preliminary round

The regular season was played between 30 November 2016 and 26 April 2017. If teams are level on record at the end of the preliminary round, tiebreakers are applied in the following order:

 Head-to-head record.
 Head-to-head point differential.
 Point differential during the Regular Season.
 Points scored during the regular season.
 Sum of quotients of points scored and points allowed in each Regular Season match.

In each group, teams played against each other home-and-away in a round-robin format. The matchdays were 30 November, 10 December, 21 December 2016 and 18 January, 8 February, 18 February, 1 March, 22 March, 5 April, 26 April 2017. The top three teams advanced to the final six.

The Final Six (quarterfinals, semifinals, third place game and final) were played in Budapest, Hungary from 25 to 27 May 2017.

Group A

Group B

Final Six
Danube Arena, Budapest, Hungary

Quarterfinals

5th place

Semifinals

Third place

Final

Final standings

Awards

See also
2016–17 LEN Euro Cup
2017 LEN Super Cup

References

External links

 
LEN Champions League seasons
Champions League
2016 in water polo
2017 in water polo